United Nations Security Council Resolution 249, adopted unanimously on April 18, 1968, after examining the application of Mauritius for membership in the United Nations, the Council recommended to the General Assembly that Mauritius be admitted.

See also
List of United Nations Security Council Resolutions 201 to 300 (1965–1971)

References
Text of the Resolution at undocs.org

External links
 

 0249
History of Mauritius
1968 in Mauritius
Foreign relations of Mauritius
 0249
 0249
April 1968 events